Baba Singhe Peyadesa  (born 7 April 1947) is a Malaysian sprinter. He competed in the men's 4 × 400 metres relay at the 1972 Summer Olympics.

Honours
  :
  Officer of the Order of the Defender of State (DSPN) – Dato' (2022)

References

External links
 

1947 births
Living people
Athletes (track and field) at the 1972 Summer Olympics
Malaysian male sprinters
Olympic athletes of Malaysia
Place of birth missing (living people)